Franziska Oehme (born 1944) is a German film and television actress.

Selected filmography
  (1967)
  (1968)
 Always Trouble with the Teachers (1968)
  (1973)
 Zwei himmlische Dickschädel (1974)
 Kassettenliebe (1981)

References

External links

1944 births
Living people
Actors from Leipzig
German film actresses
German television actresses
20th-century German actresses